

A01A Stomatological preparations

A01AA Caries prophylactic agents
A01AA01 Sodium fluoride
A01AA02 Sodium monofluorophosphate
A01AA03 Olaflur
A01AA04 Stannous fluoride
A01AA30 Combinations
A01AA51 Sodium fluoride, combinations

A01AB Anti-infectives and antiseptics for local oral treatment
A01AB02 Hydrogen peroxide
A01AB03 Chlorhexidine
A01AB04 Amphotericin B
A01AB05 Polynoxylin
A01AB06 Domiphen
A01AB07 Oxyquinoline
A01AB08 Neomycin
A01AB09 Miconazole
A01AB10 Natamycin
A01AB11 Various
A01AB12 Hexetidine
A01AB13 Tetracycline
A01AB14 Benzoxonium chloride
A01AB15 Tibezonium iodide
A01AB16 Mepartricin
A01AB17 Metronidazole
A01AB18 Clotrimazole
A01AB19 Sodium perborate
A01AB21 Chlortetracycline
A01AB22 Doxycycline
A01AB23 Minocycline
A01AB24 Octenidine
A01AB25 Oxytetracycline

A01AC Corticosteroids for local oral treatment
A01AC01 Triamcinolone
A01AC02 Dexamethasone
A01AC03 Hydrocortisone
A01AC04 Prednisolone
A01AC54 Prednisolone, combinations

A01AD Other agents for local oral treatment
A01AD01 Epinephrine
A01AD02 Benzydamine
A01AD05 Acetylsalicylic acid
A01AD06 Adrenalone
A01AD07 Amlexanox
A01AD08 Becaplermin
A01AD11 Various

References

A01